Edward H. "Snapper" Garrison (February 9, 1868 in New Haven, Connecticut – October 28, 1930 in Brooklyn, New York), was a jockey known for hanging back during most of the race and finishing at top speed to achieve a thrilling victory.

Garrison was a jockey who rode out of an East Coast base for sixteen years from 1882 through 1897. While there are no official records documenting all of his career races, he once estimated that he had ridden more than 700 winners during his career. Among his most spectacular wins was the 1892 Suburban Handicap on Montana and in 1893 at New Jersey's Guttenberg track on Tammany, both impressive finishes. Garrison was so well known for this that a contest where the winner pulls ahead at the last moment to score the victory is known as a Garrison finish.

Following the creation of the National Museum of Racing and Hall of Fame, Edward Garrison was part of the inaugural group inducted into the Hall of Fame in 1955.

References
  from Project Gutenberg;
 Hale, Ron (1997) "A Garrison Finish" About: Horseracing
 "Word for the Day: November 17, 2006" Merriam-Webster Online Dictionary;
 
 Edward Garrison at the United States' National Thoroughbred Racing Hall of Fame

American jockeys
United States Thoroughbred Racing Hall of Fame inductees
Sportspeople from New Haven, Connecticut
1868 births
1930 deaths
Burials at Holy Cross Cemetery, Brooklyn